Korgon-Döbö is a village in Jalal-Abad Region of Kyrgyzstan. It is part of the Aksy District. Its population was 1,785 in 2021.

References
 

Populated places in Jalal-Abad Region